Albery is a name. It may refer to:

People by given name
Albery Allson Whitman (1851−1901), African American poet, minister and orator

People by surname
A. S. Albery, British politician
Bronson Albery (1881−1971), English theatre director and impresario
Donald Albery (1914−1988), English theatre impresario
Ian Albery (born 1936), English theatre consultant, manager, and producer
Irving Albery (1879−1967), English politician
James Albery (1838−1889), English dramatist
John Albery (1936−2013), British chemist and academic
Nicholas Albery (1948−2001), British alternative society activist
Nobuko Albery (born 1940),  Japanese author and theatrical producer
Tim Albery (born 1952), English stage director

Entertainment
The Albery Theatre, now renamed the Noël Coward Theatre